Tonga High School is a selective state-owned co-ed secondary school located in Nukualofa, Tonga. The school educates students aged 11 to 18 (Forms 1 - 7).

History
Tonga High School was established in 1947 by Prince Tungi, the Minister of Education. Prince Tungi later became King Taufa'ahau Tupou IV, the late King of Tonga (July 1918 to September 2006). The aim of the school is to provide an opportunity for students to achieve a level of education equivalent to that offered in neighbouring countries such as New Zealand and Australia. 

The school is situated in Tonga's capital, Nukuʻalofa. The current school buildings were constructed with assistance from the Chinese Government. The buildings were officially opened on 2 July 2005. The facilities include 34 classrooms and 18 laboratories and can accommodate over a thousand students. A planned second phase of construction was due to begin in 2009 with the building of a gymnasium, swimming pool and a sports stadium.      

Entry to Form 1 is restricted to those achieving the highest marks in national examinations taken by pupils in their last year of primary school.

There were 1,154 students enrolled at the school in 2005. Students can be members of four houses: Nua (Yellow), Kava (Red), Sangone (Blue) and Tele'a (Green).

The current Principal for Tonga High School is Mrs Sipola Havili Halafihi, current Deputy Principals are Mrs Ariana Veituna, Mrs 'Oliveti Tovo and Mr Gerald Tupou. Current Senior Tutor is Mr 'Alalati Pomana and current Senior Mistress is Mrs Siutiti 'Aisea and current School Chaplain is Rev Penisimani 'Akauola Tonga. Tonga high school has a brass band and the Band Master is Mr. Taniela Lolohea Manu.

Notable people

Teachers
Sosefo Fe‘aomoeata Vakata - Tongan politician
Afuʻalo Matoto - Tongan politician
Sialeʻataongo Tuʻivakanō - Tongan politician

Students
DR Sanipisi Langi Huakavameiliku (first Tongan to enter Harvard University, the first Tongan to achieve a Ph.D.)
Viliami Latu Tongan politician
Pita Taufatofua - Australian taekwondo practitioner
Clive Edwards (politician) - former Tongan Cabinet Minister
Rev. Samisoni Fonomanu Tu'i'afitu - Tongan nobleman, Member of Parliament
Dr. Futa Helu -  founding classmember and Tongan philosopher, historian, educator, and founder of 'Atenisi University
Hon. Titilupe Fanetupouvava'u Tuita-Tupou Tu'ivakano

References

External links 
Tonga High School Ex-Students' Web Site

Educational institutions established in 1947
Schools in Tonga
1947 establishments in Tonga
Nukuʻalofa